Liminsky is a rural locality (a settlement) in Podlesnoye Rural Settlement, Vologodsky District, Vologda Oblast, Russia. The population was 34 as of 2010.

Geography 
Liminsky is located 11 km northeast of Vologda (the district's administrative centre) by road. Baranki gnu - nearest village.

References 

Rural localities in Vologodsky District